The National Football League playoffs for the 1970 season began on December 26, 1970. The postseason tournament concluded with the Baltimore Colts defeating the Dallas Cowboys in Super Bowl V, 16–13, on January 17, 1971, at the Orange Bowl in Miami, Florida.

This was the first playoff tournament after the AFL–NFL merger. An eight-team playoff tournament was designed, with four clubs from each conference qualifying. Along with the three division winners in each conference, one wild card team, the second place team with the best record from each conference, was added to the tournament. The first round was named the Divisional Playoffs, while the Conference Championship games were moved to the second playoff round and the Super Bowl became the league's championship game.

However, the home teams in the playoffs were still decided based on a yearly divisional rotation, excluding the wild card teams, who would always play on the road. Also, a rule was made that two teams from the same division could not meet in the Divisional Playoffs. In the rotation system, teams who hosted and won against the wild card team in the Divisional playoffs never could host the Conference Championship game. Conversely, this meant that the winner of Divisional playoff games that were exclusively between division winners always hosted the Conference Championship game.

This is the most recent year in which all playoff games matched up two teams that had yet to meet in the postseason in a previous year.

Participants

The defending Super Bowl champion Kansas City Chiefs finished the season 7–5–2, runner-up in the AFC West.

Bracket

Schedule
In the United States, CBS televised the NFC playoff games, while NBC broadcast the AFC games and Super Bowl V.

Divisional playoffs

Saturday, December 26, 1970

AFC: Baltimore Colts 17, Cincinnati Bengals 0

The Bengals started out their first season as an NFL team 1–6, but stormed into the playoffs by winning their last seven games. However, their comeback season came to a crushing halt in Baltimore, where the Colts' defense limited the Bengals to 7 first downs and 139 total yards of offense.  By the end of the first three quarters, the Bengals had just 47 yards and two first downs.

The closest Cincinnati came to scoring was Horst Muhlmann's 50-yard field goal attempt, which was blocked by Colts linebacker Ray May. Meanwhile, Baltimore quarterback Johnny Unitas threw two touchdown passes: a 45-yard completion to Roy Jefferson in the first quarter and a 53-yard reception to Eddie Hinton in the fourth period. Jim O'Brien added a 44-yard field goal in the second quarter. Rookie running back Norm Bulaich rushed for 116 yards.

This was the first postseason meeting between the Bengals and Colts.

NFC: Dallas Cowboys 5, Detroit Lions 0

Although they recorded 209 rushing yards, the Cowboys could only manage a field goal and a safety. But they still managed to shut out the Lions. The Cowboy defense held Lions quarterback Greg Landry to 48 passing yards. In addition, they contained his running as Landry was an excellent running QB; he averaged 10 yards per carry and gained 350 yards during the regular season. However, in this game he was held to 15 yards rushing.

In the first quarter, Cowboys rookie safety Charlie Waters recovered a fumble from Landry and returned it 9 yards to his own 45.  A 14-yard completion from Craig Morton to fullback Walt Garrison and a pair of 6-yard runs by Duane Thomas then got the team close enough for Mike Clark's 26-yard field goal to give the Cowboys a 3–0 lead.   In the second quarter, Detroit managed to advance the ball to the Dallas 29, but a jarring tackle by defensive end Larry Cole stripped the ball from RB Altie Taylor and Waters recorded his second fumble recovery to keep Detroit scoreless. The Lions would not move the ball into Dallas territory again until 59 seconds remained in the game.

In the final period, Dallas marched 76 yards in 15 plays, 51 of the yards from Thomas, to advance to the Detroit one-yard line. Rather than kick a field goal on fourth down, the Cowboys elected to give the ball to Thomas, who was stopped short of the goal line. But three plays later, Dallas defensive end George Andrie sacked Landry for a safety. Bill Munson replaced Landry and led the Lions down field in the waning moments, including a 39-yard completion to Earl McCullouch on the Dallas 29 that converted a 4th down, but the Cowboys clinched the victory in the final moments with Mel Renfro's interception at their own 11-yard line. 

The contest remains the lowest-scoring postseason game in NFL history and was just the second time in league history a game ended with a 5-0 score.

This was the first postseason meeting between the Lions and Cowboys.

Sunday, December 27, 1970

NFC: San Francisco 49ers 17, Minnesota Vikings 14

The 10–3–1 49ers, making their first playoff game since 1957, stunned the heavily favored Vikings, the defending NFL champions who had finished the regular season with an NFL best record at 12–2. The 49ers defeated the Vikings in Minnesota, despite losing three of five fumbles; Minnesota had four turnovers. The loss ended a 16-game home winning streak at Metropolitan Stadium for the Vikings, including postseason.

Quarterback John Brodie led the 49ers to their first NFL playoff victory by throwing for 201 yards and touchdown and rushing for another. The Vikings scored first when Minnesota defensive back Paul Krause picked up San Francisco running back Ken Willard's fumble in midair and returned it 22 yards for a touchdown. But the 49ers scored 17 unanswered points, first with Brodie's 24-yard touchdown pass to Dick Witcher. Then in the second quarter, San Francisco converted a Vikings fumble into Bruce Gossett's 40-yard field goal. Brodie scored the clinching touchdown, a 1-yard run, with 1:20 left. Minnesota's 24-yard touchdown pass was snapped with only seven seconds left in the game, and ended with just one second remaining on the clock.

This was the first postseason meeting between the 49ers and Vikings.

AFC: Oakland Raiders 21, Miami Dolphins 14

Quarterback Daryle Lamonica threw two touchdown passes and the Raiders scored 14-points in the second half to defeat the Dolphins 21–14 in a sea of mud at the Oakland Coliseum.

In the first quarter, both teams blew scoring chances on drives deep into opposing territory, with Raiders kicker George Blanda driving a 23-yard field goal attempt wide right and Miami's Garo Yepremian missing a kick from 24 yards.  In the second quarter, Dolphins defensive end Bill Stanfill recovered a fumble from Charlie Smith on the Raiders 19 that set up Bob Griese's 16-yard touchdown pass to Paul Warfield.  With less than five minutes left in the half, Raiders quarterback Daryle Lamonica led the team on a 62-yard scoring drive to tie the game at 7, completing a 21-yard pass to tight end Raymond Chester and an 11-yarder to Fred Biletnikoff before connecting with Beletnikoff in the end zone from 22 yards out.

Oakland took the second half kickoff and drove all the way to the Dolphins 2-yard line, but Smith lost another fumble, this was one recovered by defensive back Jake Scott, and the Raiders were unable to break the tie.  On the first play after the turnover, Miami quarterback Bob Griese hooked up with Paul Warfield for 24-yard gain.  But later in the drive, he was sacked for a 12-yard loss.  Faced with 3rd down and 19, Griese had to go deep to attempt a first down completion.  He attempted to throw to Warfield, only to see his pass intercepted by Willie Brown and returned 50 yards for a touchdown, giving the Raiders a 14–7 lead.

Early in the fourth quarter, Miami drove into scoring range, but came up empty when Yepremian missed another field goal attempt from 24 yards.  Two plays later, on 3rd down and 12 Lamonica fired a pass to Rod Sherman, who took off for an 82-yard touchdown completion to put the Raiders up 21–7.  Miami responded by picking up five first downs on a 69-yard drive that ended with Griese's 7-yard touchdown pass to Willie Richardson.  Then with 2:22 left, they managed for force a punt, giving them one last chance to drive for a tying touchdown.  However, the Raiders forced a turnover on downs and then ran out the rest of the clock.

Lamonica finished the game 8/16 for 187 yards and two touchdowns, with no interceptions.

This was the first postseason meeting between the Dolphins and Raiders.

Conference Championships

Sunday, January 3, 1971

AFC: Baltimore Colts 27, Oakland Raiders 17

Colts quarterback Johnny Unitas's 68-yard touchdown pass to Ray Perkins in the fourth quarter gave the Colts a two score lead that the Raiders could not overcome, sending his team to their second Super Bowl in the last three years.

Baltimore dominated the first quarter, holding the Raiders to six plays and one completion, while Unitas led them to the 4-yard line where Jim O'Brien's 16-yard field goal gave them a 3–0 lead.

In the second quarter, a massive hit by Colts defensive tackle Bubba Smith knocked Oakland QB Daryle Lamonica out of the game, and he was replaced by George Blanda.  Later on, Willie Brown narrowly dropped an interception on a deep pass from Unitas.  At the time this did not seem to matter much, as the incomplete pass was on third down and the Colts had to punt.  But returner George Atkinson fumbled David Lee's kick and the Colts running back Sam Havrilak recovered with excellent field position.  Unitas then completed a 43-yard pass to Eddie Hinton at the 2-yard line, and Norm Bulaich scored a touchdown run on the next play, increasing the lead to 10–0.  Blanda then led the Raiders back, and with the aid of a roughing the punter penalty, he got them close enough for a 48-yard field goal, which he kicked himself to cut the score 10–3 at the end of the half.

Oakland tied the score early in the third quarter with Blanda's 38-yard touchdown pass to Fred Biletnikoff.  Unitas responded with two key long completions to Hinton that set up O'Brien's 23-yard field goal to retake the lead at 13–10.  Later in the quarter, Buliach scored on an 11-yard touchdown run, giving the Colts a 20–10 lead going into the fourth quarter.

Now down by two scores with just one quarter left, Blanda got the Raiders rolling on a long touchdown drive.  First running back Charlie Smith picked up 20 yards on a draw play (the longest run of the game for either team).  Then Blanda fooled the Colts defense with a fake handoff before firing a pass to Warren Wells for a 37-yard gain to the Colts 11.  Blanda eventually finished the drive with a 15-yard touchdown pass to Wells on third down, making the score 20–17.  The momentum seemed to be swinging back in their favor when they forced the Colts into a 3rd and 11 situation on their own 32-yard line on the next drive.  On the next play, Unitas threw a deep pass to a wide open Ray Perkins, who raced down the left sideline for a 68-yard touchdown completion that gave the Colts a 27–17 lead.  This would prove to be the last score of the game as the Raiders were shut out in the final 12 minutes, with Blanda throwing two interceptions deep in Baltimore territory.

Blanda finished the game completing 17 of 32 passes for 271 yards with 2 touchdowns and 3 interceptions. At 43 years old, he was the oldest quarterback ever to play in a championship game.  His top target was Wells, who caught 5 passes for 108 yards and a touchdown.  Unitas completed 11 of 30 passes for 245 yards and a touchdown.  The Colts leading receiver was Hinton, who caught 8 passes for 115 yards.  Bubba Smith and Ray Hilton each had two sacks, along with Raiders defensive end Ben Davidson.

This would turn out to be the final home playoff win for the Colts in Baltimore before they moved to Indianapolis in 1984.

This was the first postseason meeting between the Raiders and Colts.

NFC: Dallas Cowboys 17, San Francisco 49ers 10

Although Dallas quarterback Craig Morton only completed 7 out of 22 passes for 101 yards, rookie halfback Duane Thomas rushed for 143 yards and caught 2 passes for 24 as Dallas converted two third quarter interceptions into 14 points to defeat the 49ers.

On the second drive of the game, 49ers quarterback John Brodie's 42-yard completion to Gene Washington at the Cowboys 9-yard line set up Bruce Gossett's 16-yard field goal to give the team a 3–0 lead, but only after Brodie misfired on a pass to fullback Ken Willard, who was open in the end zone.  This would be the only score of the half for San Francisco.  Dallas fared little better, with Mike Clark missing a field goal from 40 yards out, and later kicking a 21-yard field goal to tie the game at 3.

After each team punted once in the second half, San Francisco had the ball on their own 21-yard line.  On the first play, Brodie was sacked by linebacker Dave Edwards for a 7-yard loss.  Then on second down, Lee Roy Jordan intercepted Brodie's pass and returned it 4 yards to the 13, where Thomas scored a touchdown run for Dallas on the next play, breaking three tackles en route to the end zone.  On San Francisco's next series, Mel Renfro picked off a pass from Brodie and returned it 19 yards to the Cowboys 38-yard line, setting off a 62-yard scoring drive for his team.  The key player on the drive was fullback Walt Garrison, who had a 12-yard carry, gained 24 yards on a screen pass, and finished it off with a 5-yard touchdown catch from Morton to give the Cowboys a 17–3 lead.

San Francisco responded with an 8-play, 72-yard drive to score on Brodie's 26-yard touchdown pass to tight end Dick Witcher and cut the score to 17–10 going into the fourth quarter, but they were shut out for the rest of the game.  They nearly got a big scoring chance when Thomas fumbled the ball, but receiver Reggie Rucker recovered it, allowing Dallas to keep possession and take a lot of time off the clock with a drive to the 49ers 17-yard line.  Clark missed a field goal attempt from there, giving San Francisco a chance to drive for the tying touchdown, but the farthest they could make it was to the Dallas 39, and after Renfro broke up a third down pass, Gossett missed a field goal from 47 yards out, and 49ers would not threaten to score again.

This was the 49ers first playoff game at home since 1957 and the team's last home game to be played at Kezar Stadium. Johnny Mathis sang the national anthem, and Tony Bennett performed his signature song "I Left My Heart in San Francisco" at halftime.

This was the first postseason meeting between the Cowboys and 49ers.

Super Bowl V: Baltimore Colts 16, Dallas Cowboys 13

This is the only Super Bowl meeting between the Colts and Cowboys.

References

Total Football: The Official Encyclopedia of the National Football League
The Sporting News Complete Super Bowl Book 1995

National Football League playoffs
Playoffs
NFL playoffs
NFL playoffs